Garretson is a city in Minnehaha County, South Dakota, United States. The city had a population of 1,228 at the 2020 census.

History
The city has the name of A. S. Garretson, a local banker.

Geography
Garretson is located at  (43.714479, -96.502020).

Garretson has been assigned the ZIP code 57030 and the FIPS place code 23820.

Demographics

2010 census
As of the census of 2010, there were 1,166 people, 449 households, and 308 families living in the city. The racial makeup of the city was 98.5% White, 0.3% African American, 0.3% Native American, and 0.6% from two or more races (Mulatto, Eurasian, mixed races)  Hispanic or Latino of any race were 0.3% of the population.

There were 449 households, of which 38.5% had children under the age of 18 living with them, 53.9% were married couples living together, 10.7% had a female householder with no husband present, 4.0% had a male householder with no wife present, and 31.4% were non-families. 26.9% of all households were made up of individuals, and 12.9% had someone living alone who was 65 years of age or older. The average household size was 2.48 and the average family size was 3.03.

The median age in the city was 38.1 years. 28.6% of residents were under the age of 18; 5% were between the ages of 18 and 24; 26.4% were from 25 to 44; 24.8% were from 45 to 64; and 15.2% were 65 years of age or older. The gender makeup of the city was 47.0% male and 53.0% female.

2000 census
As of the census of 2000, there were 1,165 people, 427 households, and 313 families living in the city. The population density was 786.9 people per square mile (303.9/km2). There were 458 housing units at an average density of 309.4 per square mile (119.5/km2). The racial makeup of the city was 97.60% White, 0.26% African American, 0.94% Native American, 0.09% Asian, 0.26% from other races, and 0.86% from two or more races. Hispanic or Latino of any race were 0.52% of the population.

There were 427 households, out of which 39.1% had children under the age of 18 living with them, 59.0% were married couples living together, 9.4% had a female householder with no husband present, and 26.5% were non-families. 24.4% of all households were made up of individuals, and 13.1% had someone living alone who was 65 years of age or older. The average household size was 2.59 and the average family size was 3.04.

In the city, the population was spread out, with 28.2% under the age of 18, 6.7% from 18 to 24, 29.3% from 25 to 44, 17.0% from 45 to 64, and 18.8% who were 65 years of age or older. The median age was 37 years. For every 100 females, there were 87.3 males. For every 100 females age 18 and over, there were 89.1 males.

As of 2000 the median income for a household in the city was $39,352, and the median income for a family was $46,389. Males had a median income of $32,212 versus $21,824 for females. The per capita income for the city was $16,981. About 3.1% of families and 4.6% of the population were below the poverty line, including 3.8% of those under age 18 and 10.7% of those age 65 or over.

Points of interest
Garretson is home to Devil's Gulch, the site where Jesse James allegedly escaped a posse after robbing the First National Bank in Northfield, Minnesota, and Split rock park, the site of the cities bathhouse from the founding.

Palisades State Park is also near Garretson.

Education
Garretson Public Schools are part of the Garretson School District (South Dakota). The Garretson School District has one elementary school, one middle school, and one high school.

Students attend Garretson High School.

References

External links
 City website

Cities in South Dakota
Cities in Minnehaha County, South Dakota
Sioux Falls, South Dakota metropolitan area